Karyorrhexis (from Greek κάρυον karyon 'kernel, seed, nucleus' and ῥῆξις rhexis 'bursting') is the destructive fragmentation of the nucleus of a dying cell whereby its chromatin is distributed irregularly throughout the cytoplasm. It is usually preceded by pyknosis and can occur as a result of either programmed cell death (apoptosis), cellular senescence, or necrosis.

In apoptosis, the cleavage of DNA is done by Ca2+ and Mg2+ -dependent endonucleases.

See also 
Karyolysis

References 

Cellular processes
Cellular senescence
Programmed cell death